The Make-Up Artists and Hair Stylists Guild Award for Best Makeup in Children and Teen Programming is one of the awards given annually to people working in the television industry by the Make-Up Artists and Hair Stylists Guild (MUAHS). It is presented to makeup artists who work in television, whose work has been deemed "best" in a given year. It was first given in 2015.

Winners and nominees

2010s

2020s

References

Makeup in Children and Teen Programming
Children's television awards
Awards established in 2015